Illuminated World (formerly Förlaget Illuminated Sweden, AB.) Lidingö, is a  Swedish publishing group best known for releasing Bible Illuminated: The Book. Composed of business executives and headed by Dag Söderberg and Jan Carlzon, the group was formed to foster the Book’s production.  Illuminated World has partnerships with both the American Bible Society and  Midpoint Trade Books.

Bible Illuminated: THE BOOK - Nya testamentet
In 2007, Illuminated World published Bible Illuminated: The Book, a two-volume  glossy release that combines a Swedish translation of the Bible with contemporary photographs in the format of a 300-page glossy magazine, Instead of the Swedish word "Boken", "The Book", English was chosen to sound more challenging and modern. The two volumes were subtitled "Gamla testamentet" and "Nya testamentet". 

The publication was developed following a discussion of the Bible’s readership and accessibility;  according to Söderberg, the group decided to reproduce both Testaments "in a magazine style with interesting images and running text instead of chapters, verses… a format most people are familiar with when reading news stories." The first run of Bible Illuminated: The Book increased bible sales in the mostly secular Sweden by nearly 50 percent.

Bible Illuminated: The Book (English edition)
The text of the  Good News Translation replaces the original Swedish in the English-language version, which was published October 2008. Bible Illuminated: The Book and its author Dag Söderberg were featured on the June 4th, 2009 episode of The Colbert Report.

References

External links
The Bible, but not as you know it – BBC article

Bible versions and translations
Bible translations into Swedish
Bible translations into English